Kjerag or Kiragg is a mountain in the Sandnes municipality in Rogaland county, Norway. Its northern side is a massive cliff, plunging  almost straight down to the fjord; a sight which attracts many visitors each year. Another tourist attraction, the Kjeragbolten, is a  stone wedged between two rocks is located on the mountain. The Kjeragfossen waterfall plunges off the mountain down to the fjord. It is one of the tallest waterfalls in the world.

Kjerag is a popular hiking destination. Some go there because Preikestolen has become too crowded, some to jump onto Kjeragbolten and some BASE jumpers from all over the world go there to jump off the high cliffs. Kjerag is also a popular climbing destination, with many difficult routes going up its steep faces. The easiest ascent starts from the visitor center Øygardsstølen, with a 2.5-3-hour walk each way. From Stavanger, it is roughly a 2-hour drive (closed in winter season). One can also take the tourist ferry from Lauvvik to Lysebotn in summer. The best season for walking is considered late June to September depending on snow conditions.

Kjeragbolten

Kjeragbolten is a  boulder wedged in a mountain crevice by the edge of the Kjerag mountain. It is possible to walk onto the rock without any equipment, but there is a direct  drop below and then another  gradient down to the Lysefjorden. The name means "Kjerag Boulder" or "Kjerag Bolt".

BASE jumping
Kjerag has become a popular BASE jumping destination. Since 1994, when Stein Edvartsen made the first officially registered jump, until 2016, a total number of  jumps have been registered. During this time period 131 accidents have been registered, 44 of which required the use of rescue helicopter, and 10 cases where jumpers were rescued by other professional rescue climbers. According to the Norwegian Broadcasting Corporation there have been 11 fatal accidents involving BASE jumpers alone. A list of jumpers who perished at Kjerag is provided below:
 Sebastian Dectot (24, from France), August 16, 1996
 Ulla-Stina Östberg (46, from Sweden), July 29, 1997
 Thor Alex Kappfjell (32, from Norway), July 6, 1999
 Kirill Goretov (29, from Russia), August 15, 1999
 Terry Forrestal (52, from the United Kingdom), June 10, 2000
 Valentino Venturi (30, from Italy), August 5, 2000
 Lori Barr (37, from the United States), July 23, 2002
 Rob Tompkins (30, from the United States), September 12, 2002
 Darcy Zoitsas (nickname: "Peter Pan") (39, from Australia), July 19, 2005
 Anton Knestyapin (25, from Russia), July 25, 2010
 Michael Leming (53, from the United States), June 25, 2016 

In the Norwegian documentary film Loop, Kristen Reagan climbs up the  drop before BASE jumping off the same cliff.

Rock Climbing
Kjerag was first climbed in the spring of 1985 by Pat Littlejohn, Steve Jones, Dick Renshaw and Lyndsey Foulkes, who abseiled in without sighting the wall from below, and chose their route from photographs in the public domain. Pete Whittaker having performed a roped solo of Free-Rider on El Capitan in autumn 2016, free-soloed the Renshaw-Foulkes climb in summer 2020.

Name
The name is possibly a compound of kje which means 'kid' and ragg which means 'goat's hair, shag'. The rough surface of the mountainside has been compared with the shaggy hair of a kid goat.

In popular culture 
A movie song called Amali thumali (from 01:33m to 1:35m and from 04:19m to 04:21m ) from the 2011 blockbuster Tamil language movie Ko (film) features the lead couples dancing on the top of the boulder at Kjeragbolten.

Gallery

See also

 Kjeragbolten
 Preikestolen

References

External links

 Kjeragbolten - 360* Panoramic Pictures - Virtual Norge
 Flickr Kjerabolten Images
 Ryfylke - Kjerag 

Sandnes
Cliffs of Norway
Mountains of Rogaland
Landforms of Rogaland